Ruedi Vogel (born 4 March 1947) is a Swiss boxer. He competed in the men's featherweight event at the 1972 Summer Olympics. At the 1972 Summer Olympics, he defeated Joseph M'Bouroukounda of Gabon, before losing to Ryszard Tomczyk of Poland.

References

1947 births
Living people
Featherweight boxers
Swiss male boxers
Olympic boxers of Switzerland
Boxers at the 1972 Summer Olympics
Place of birth missing (living people)